NGC 5641 is a type Sb-barred spiral galaxy in the constellation of Boötes, registered in New General Catalogue (NGC). It is located five degrees east of NGC 5466.

Observation history
NGC 5641 was discovered by Édouard Stephan on 4 June 1880. John Louis Emil Dreyer inside the New General Catalogue, described the galaxy as "pretty bright, pretty small, a little extended, much brighter middle, mottled but not resolved?" It was described in Burnham's Celestial Handbook as "pretty bright, pretty small, slightly elongated and much brighter in the middle". Walter Scott Houston also noted that this galaxy was missed by William Herschel. He wrote "although NGC 5641 is only 2' long, this should not have been a problem for Herschel observing at 157x."

Notes

References

Galaxies discovered in 1880
5641
Astronomical objects discovered in 1880
Barred spiral galaxies
NGC 5641
Discoveries by Édouard Stephan